The Spekboom River is a river in Mpumalanga Province, South Africa. It flows northeastwards and is a tributary of the Steelpoort River.

See also
 List of rivers of South Africa

References

External links
 Google map of the Spekboom River's mouth at Geonames.org (cc-by)

Olifants River (Limpopo)
Rivers of Mpumalanga